Shryock is an unincorporated community in Greenbrier County, West Virginia, United States.

The community was named after Thomas J. Shryock, an official with the St. Lawrence Boom and Lumber Company.

References

Unincorporated communities in Greenbrier County, West Virginia
Unincorporated communities in West Virginia